Tirolerkuchen, or Tiroler Nusskuchen, (Tyrolean Cake or Tyrolean Nut Cake in German) is a type of cake found in Austria, Germany, Switzerland, and the Italian region of South Tyrol. It is often used as a coffee cake.

Originating in Tyrol, the cake is made using hazelnut, flour, butter, egg yolk, meringue, sugar, and chocolate. Some versions include bourbon in the ingredients.

References 

Austrian pastries
German pastries
Italian pastries
Swiss pastries
Tyrolean culture